Donato Gentile (born 15 February 1957 in Piacenza) is an Italian politician.

He is a member of the centre-right party Forza Italia and he served as Mayor of Biella from 8 June 2009 to 10 June 2014.

See also
2009 Italian local elections
List of mayors of Biella

References

External links
 

1957 births
Living people
Mayors of Biella
The People of Freedom politicians
Forza Italia (2013) politicians